Fenyi may refer to:

Fenyi County, in Jiangxi, China
Fényi (crater), lunar crater on the far side of the Moon
Gyula Fényi (1845–1927), Hungarian Jesuit and astronomer